USS Tenadores was a transport ship for the United States Navy during World War I. Before the war she was known as SS Tenadores in the service of the United Fruit Company. Before her Navy service, she served as a United States Army transport under the name USAT Tenadores.

World War I
Tenadores was built in 1913 by Workman, Clark and Co. of Belfast, Northern Ireland for the United Fruit Company. After being turned over to the U.S. Army on 24 May 1917, the steamer served as Army transport USAT Tenadores. Two torpedoes passed near Havana and two torpedoes straddled DeKalb. No submarines were definitively sighted, and the convoy — scattered by the alarm — reformed the next morning. The group, alerted by reports of submarine activity near Brest diverted to Saint-Nazaire and arrived on 25 June.

Tenadores was taken over by the U.S. Navy on 12 April 1918 and commissioned on 17 April 1918. Tenadores served as a troop transport during the remainder of World War I. Shortly after midnight on 28 December, the ship grounded in a heavy fog off the north coast of the Île d'Yeu.

On 30 December, minesweeper  rescued the last members of the transport's crew. On 2 January 1919, Hubbard returned to Tenadores for one last attempt to salvage the ship but was thwarted by high seas and the hopeless state of the transport, which was lying on her starboard side and breaking up. The name Tenadores was struck from the Naval Vessel Register on 18 February.

Notes

References

External links
Photo gallery at navsource.org

Ships built in Belfast
Ocean liners
Passenger ships of the United States
World War I auxiliary ships of the United States
Transport ships of the United States Army
Transports of the United States Navy
1913 ships
Maritime incidents in 1918